In mathematics, curvature is any of several strongly related concepts in geometry. Intuitively, the curvature is the amount by which a curve deviates from being a straight line, or a surface deviates from being a plane.

For curves, the canonical example is that of a circle, which has a curvature equal to the reciprocal of its radius. Smaller circles bend more sharply, and hence have higher curvature. The curvature at a point of a differentiable curve is the curvature of its osculating circle, that is the circle that best approximates the curve near this point. The curvature of a straight line is zero. In contrast to the tangent, which is a vector quantity, the curvature at a point is typically a scalar quantity, that is, it is expressed by a single real number.

For surfaces (and, more generally for higher-dimensional manifolds), that are embedded in a Euclidean space, the concept of curvature is more complex, as it depends on the choice of a direction on the surface or manifold. This leads to the concepts of maximal curvature, minimal curvature, and mean curvature.

For Riemannian manifolds (of dimension at least two) that are not necessarily embedded in a Euclidean space, one can define the curvature intrinsically, that is without referring to an external space. See Curvature of Riemannian manifolds for the definition, which is done in terms of lengths of curves traced on the manifold, and expressed, using linear algebra, by the Riemann curvature tensor.

History

In Tractatus de configurationibus qualitatum et motuum, the 14th-century philosopher and mathematician Nicole Oresme introduces the concept of curvature as a measure of departure from straightness; for circles he has the curvature as being inversely proportional to the radius; and he attempts to extend this idea to other curves as a continuously varying magnitude. 

The curvature of a differentiable curve was originally defined through osculating circles. In this setting, Augustin-Louis Cauchy showed that the center of curvature is the intersection point of two infinitely close normal lines to the curve.

Plane curves
Intuitively, the curvature describes for any part of a curve how much the curve direction changes over a small distance travelled (e.g. angle in ), so it is a measure of the instantaneous rate of change of direction of a point that moves on the curve: the larger the curvature, the larger this rate of change. In other words, the curvature measures how fast the unit tangent vector to the curve rotates (fast in terms of curve position). In fact, it can be proved that this instantaneous rate of change is exactly the curvature. More precisely, suppose that the point is moving on the curve at a constant speed of one unit, that is, the position of the point  is a function of the parameter , which may be thought as the time or as the arc length from a given origin.

The characterization of the curvature in terms of the derivative of the unit tangent vector is probably less intuitive than the definition in terms of the osculating circle, but formulas for computing the curvature are easier to deduce. Therefore, and also because of its use in kinematics, this characterization is often given as a definition of the curvature.

Osculating circle

Historically, the curvature of a differentiable curve was defined through the osculating circle, which is the circle that best approximates the curve at a point. The curvature is the reciprocal of radius of curvature. That is, the curvature is 
 
where  is the radius of curvature (the whole circle has this curvature, it can be read as turn  over the length ).

This definition is difficult to manipulate and to express in formulas. Therefore, other equivalent definitions have been introduced.

In terms of arc-length parametrization
Every differentiable curve can be parametrized with respect to arc length.

This means that the tangent vector

has a norm equal to one and is thus a unit tangent vector.

This vector is normal to the curve, its norm is the curvature , and it is oriented toward the center of curvature. That is,

Moreover, because the radius of curvature is (assuming 𝜿(s) ≠ 0)

and the center of curvature is on the normal to the curve, the center of curvature is the point 
 

(In case the curvature is zero, the center of curvature is not located anywhere on the plane R2 and is often said to be located "at infinity".)

The real number  is called the oriented curvature or signed curvature. It depends on both the orientation of the plane (definition of counterclockwise), and the orientation of the curve provided by the parametrization.

In terms of a general parametrization 
Let  be a proper parametric representation of a twice differentiable plane curve. Here proper means that on the domain of definition of the parametrization, the derivative 
is defined, differentiable and nowhere equal to the zero vector.

With such a parametrization, the signed curvature is 

The curvature  is thus

These can be expressed in a coordinate-free way as

These formulas can be derived from the special case of arc-length parametrization in the following way. Using notation of the preceding section and the chain rule, one has 

and thus, by taking the norm of both sides 

Graph of a function
The graph of a function , is a special case of a parametrized curve, of the form

for the curvature, and to

for the signed curvature.

In the general case of a curve, the sign of the signed curvature is somewhat arbitrary, as it depends on the orientation of the curve. This makes significant the sign of the signed curvature.

If it is positive then the graph has an upward concavity, and, if it is negative the graph has a downward concavity. It is zero, then  one has an inflection point or an undulation point.

When the slope of the graph (that is the derivative of the function) is small, the signed curvature is well approximated by the second derivative. More precisely, using big O notation, one has 

 
It is common in physics and engineering to approximate the curvature with the second derivative, for example, in beam theory or for deriving the wave equation of a string under tension, and other applications where small slopes are involved. This often allows systems that are otherwise nonlinear to be treated approximately as linear.

Polar coordinates

This results from the formula for general parametrizations, by considering the parametrization

Implicit curve 

the curvature is given by

The signed curvature is not defined, as it depends on an orientation of the curve that is not provided by the implicit equation.

A point of the curve where  is a singular point, which means that the curve is not differentiable at this point, and thus that the curvature is not defined (most often, the point is either a crossing point or a cusp).

Above formula for the curvature can be derived from the expression of the curvature of the graph of a function by using the implicit function theorem and the fact that, on such a curve, one has

Examples 
It can be useful to verify on simple examples that the different formulas given in the preceding sections give the same result.

Circle
The formula for the curvature gives

It follows, as expected, that the radius of curvature is the radius of the circle, and that the center of curvature is the center of the circle.

The circle is a rare case where the arc-length parametrization is easy to compute, as it is

It is an arc-length parametrization, since the norm of

is equal to one.

Then, the formula for the curvature in this case  gives

Parabola
Consider the parabola .

It is the graph of a function, with derivative , and second derivative . So, the signed curvature is 

Consider the parametrization . If we use primes for derivatives with respect to the parameter .

Frenet–Serret formulas for plane curves

The expression of the curvature In terms of arc-length parametrization is essentially the first Frenet–Serret formula

As planar curves have zero torsion, the second Frenet–Serret formula provides the relation

Curvature comb

A curvature comb can be used to represent graphically the curvature of every point on a curve. If  is a parametrised curve its comb is defined as the parametrized curve

Space curves

As in the case of curves in two dimensions, the curvature of a regular space curve  in three dimensions (and higher) is the magnitude of the acceleration of a particle moving with unit speed along a curve. Thus if  is the arc-length parametrization of  then the unit tangent vector  is given by

and the curvature is the magnitude of the acceleration:

The direction of the acceleration is the unit normal vector , which is defined by

The curvature has the following geometrical interpretation. This is the osculating circle to the curve. The radius of the circle  is called the radius of curvature, and the curvature is the reciprocal of the radius of curvature:

The tangent, curvature, and normal vector together describe the second-order behavior of a curve near a point. In three dimensions, the third-order behavior of a curve is described by a related notion of torsion, which measures the extent to which a curve tends to move as a helical path in space. The torsion and curvature are related by the Frenet–Serret formulas (in three dimensions) and their generalization (in higher dimensions).

General expressions

where the prime denotes differentiation with respect to the parameter . This can be expressed independently of the coordinate system by means of the formula

where × denotes the vector cross product. The following formula is valid for the curvature of curves in a Euclidean space of any dimension:

Curvature from arc and chord length

The denominator can equally well be taken to be . The formula is valid in any dimension. The formula follows by verifying it for the osculating circle.

Surfaces

The curvature of curves drawn on a surface is the main tool for the defining and studying the curvature of the surface.

Curves on surfaces
For a curve drawn on a surface (embedded in three-dimensional Euclidean space), several curvatures are defined, which relates the direction of curvature to the surface's unit normal vector, including the:
 normal curvature
geodesic curvature 
geodesic torsion 
Any non-singular curve on a smooth surface has its tangent vector  contained in the tangent plane of the surface. The normal curvature, is the curvature of the curve projected onto the plane containing the curve's tangent  and the surface normal ; the geodesic curvature, is the curvature of the curve projected onto the surface's tangent plane; and the geodesic torsion (or relative torsion), measures the rate of change of the surface normal around the curve's tangent.

Let the curve be arc-length parametrized, and let  so that  form an orthonormal basis, called the Darboux frame. The above quantities are related by:

Principal curvature

Normal sections

Developable surfaces
Some curved surfaces, such as those made from a smooth sheet of paper, can be flattened down into the plane without distorting their intrinsic features in any way. Such developable surfaces have zero Gaussian curvature (see below).

Gaussian curvature

In contrast to curves, which do not have intrinsic curvature, but do have extrinsic curvature (they only have a curvature given an embedding), surfaces can have intrinsic curvature, independent of an embedding. The Gaussian curvature, named after Carl Friedrich Gauss, is equal to the product of the principal curvatures, . It has a dimension of length−2 and is positive for spheres, negative for one-sheet hyperboloids and zero for planes and cylinders. It determines whether a surface is locally convex (when it is positive) or locally saddle-shaped (when it is negative).

Gaussian curvature is an intrinsic property of the surface, meaning it does not depend on the particular embedding of the surface; intuitively, this means that ants living on the surface could determine the Gaussian curvature. For example, an ant living on a sphere could measure the sum of the interior angles of a triangle and determine that it was greater than 180 degrees, implying that the space it inhabited had positive curvature. On the other hand, an ant living on a cylinder would not detect any such departure from Euclidean geometry; in particular the ant could not detect that the two surfaces have different mean curvatures (see below), which is a purely extrinsic type of curvature.

Formally, Gaussian curvature only depends on the Riemannian metric of the surface. This is Gauss's celebrated Theorema Egregium, which he found while concerned with geographic surveys and mapmaking.

If the surface were flat, the ant would find . On curved surfaces, the formula for  will be different, and the Gaussian curvature  at the point  can be computed by the Bertrand–Diguet–Puiseux theorem as

The integral of the Gaussian curvature over the whole surface is closely related to the surface's Euler characteristic; see the Gauss–Bonnet theorem.

The discrete analog of curvature, corresponding to curvature being concentrated at a point and particularly useful for polyhedra, is the (angular) defect; the analog for the Gauss–Bonnet theorem is Descartes' theorem on total angular defect.

Because (Gaussian) curvature can be defined without reference to an embedding space, it is not necessary that a surface be embedded in a higher-dimensional space in order to be curved. Such an intrinsically curved two-dimensional surface is a simple example of a Riemannian manifold.

Mean curvature

The mean curvature is an extrinsic measure of curvature equal to half the sum of the principal curvatures, . It has a dimension of length−1. Mean curvature is closely related to the first variation of surface area. In particular, a minimal surface such as a soap film has mean curvature zero and a soap bubble has constant mean curvature. Unlike Gauss curvature, the mean curvature is extrinsic and depends on the embedding, for instance, a cylinder and a plane are locally isometric but the mean curvature of a plane is zero while that of a cylinder is nonzero.

Second fundamental form 

The intrinsic and extrinsic curvature of a surface can be combined in the second fundamental form. Symbolically,

where  is the unit normal to the surface. Thus, by the principal axis theorem, the second fundamental form is

Thus the second fundamental form encodes both the intrinsic and extrinsic curvatures.

Shape operator 

An encapsulation of surface curvature can be found in the shape operator, which is a self-adjoint linear operator from the tangent plane to itself (specifically, the differential of the Gauss map).

For a surface with tangent vectors  and normal , the shape operator can be expressed compactly in index summation notation as

(Compare the alternative expression of curvature for a plane curve.)

The principal curvatures are the eigenvalues of the shape operator, the principal curvature directions are its eigenvectors, the Gauss curvature is its determinant, and the mean curvature is half its trace.

Curvature of space

By extension of the former argument, a space of three or more dimensions can be intrinsically curved. The curvature is intrinsic in the sense that it is a property defined at every point in the space, rather than a property defined with respect to a larger space that contains it. In general, a curved space may or may not be conceived as being embedded in a higher-dimensional ambient space; if not then its curvature can only be defined intrinsically.

After the discovery of the intrinsic definition of curvature, which is closely connected with non-Euclidean geometry, many mathematicians and scientists questioned whether ordinary physical space might be curved, although the success of Euclidean geometry up to that time meant that the radius of curvature must be astronomically large. In the theory of general relativity, which describes gravity and cosmology, the idea is slightly generalised to the "curvature of spacetime"; in relativity theory spacetime is a pseudo-Riemannian manifold. Once a time coordinate is defined, the three-dimensional space corresponding to a particular time is generally a curved Riemannian manifold; but since the time coordinate choice is largely arbitrary, it is the underlying spacetime curvature that is physically significant.

Although an arbitrarily curved space is very complex to describe, the curvature of a space which is locally isotropic and homogeneous is described by a single Gaussian curvature, as for a surface; mathematically these are strong conditions, but they correspond to reasonable physical assumptions (all points and all directions are indistinguishable). A positive curvature corresponds to the inverse square radius of curvature; an example is a sphere or hypersphere. An example of negatively curved space is hyperbolic geometry (see also: non-positive curvature). A space or space-time with zero curvature is called flat. For example, Euclidean space is an example of a flat space, and Minkowski space is an example of a flat spacetime. There are other examples of flat geometries in both settings, though. A torus or a cylinder can both be given flat metrics, but differ in their topology. Other topologies are also possible for curved space. See also shape of the universe.

Generalizations

The mathematical notion of curvature is also defined in much more general contexts. Many of these generalizations emphasize different aspects of the curvature as it is understood in lower dimensions.

One such generalization is kinematic. The curvature of a curve can naturally be considered as a kinematic quantity, representing the force felt by a certain observer moving along the curve; analogously, curvature in higher dimensions can be regarded as a kind of tidal force (this is one way of thinking of the sectional curvature). This generalization of curvature depends on how nearby test particles diverge or converge when they are allowed to move freely in the space; see Jacobi field.

Another broad generalization of curvature comes from the study of parallel transport on a surface. For instance, if a vector is moved around a loop on the surface of a sphere keeping parallel throughout the motion, then the final position of the vector may not be the same as the initial position of the vector. This phenomenon is known as holonomy. Various generalizations capture in an abstract form this idea of curvature as a measure of holonomy; see curvature form. A closely related notion of curvature comes from gauge theory in physics, where the curvature represents a field and a vector potential for the field is a quantity that is in general path-dependent: it may change if an observer moves around a loop.

Two more generalizations of curvature are the scalar curvature and Ricci curvature. In a curved surface such as the sphere, the area of a disc on the surface differs from the area of a disc of the same radius in flat space. This difference (in a suitable limit) is measured by the scalar curvature. The difference in area of a sector of the disc is measured by the Ricci curvature. Each of the scalar curvature and Ricci curvature are defined in analogous ways in three and higher dimensions. They are particularly important in relativity theory, where they both appear on the side of Einstein's field equations that represents the geometry of spacetime (the other side of which represents the presence of matter and energy). These generalizations of curvature underlie, for instance, the notion that curvature can be a property of a measure; see curvature of a measure.

Another generalization of curvature relies on the ability to compare a curved space with another space that has constant curvature. Often this is done with triangles in the spaces. The notion of a triangle makes senses in metric spaces, and this gives rise to  spaces.

See also
 Curvature form for the appropriate notion of curvature for vector bundles and principal bundles with connection
 Curvature of a measure for a notion of curvature in measure theory
 Curvature of parametric surfaces
 Curvature of Riemannian manifolds for generalizations of Gauss curvature to higher-dimensional Riemannian manifolds
 Curvature vector and geodesic curvature for appropriate notions of curvature of curves in Riemannian manifolds, of any dimension
 Degree of curvature
 Differential geometry of curves for a full treatment of curves embedded in a Euclidean space of arbitrary dimension
 Dioptre, a measurement of curvature used in optics
 Evolute, the locus of the centers of curvature of a given curve
 Fundamental theorem of curves
 Gauss–Bonnet theorem for an elementary application of curvature
 Gauss map for more geometric properties of Gauss curvature
 Gauss's principle of least constraint, an expression of the Principle of Least Action
 Mean curvature at one point on a surface
 Minimum railway curve radius
 Radius of curvature
 Second fundamental form for the extrinsic curvature of hypersurfaces in general
 Sinuosity
 Torsion of a curve

Notes

References
 
 
 
 

External links

The Feynman Lectures on Physics Vol. II Ch. 42: Curved Space
The History of Curvature
Curvature, Intrinsic and Extrinsic at MathPages

 
Multivariable calculus
Articles containing video clips